Tesla is an unincorporated community in Braxton County, West Virginia, United States.

The community might be named after Nikola Tesla (1856–1943), an electrical engineer and inventor. Located near Tesla is the Windy Run Grade School, listed on the National Register of Historic Places in 1983.

References

Unincorporated communities in Braxton County, West Virginia
Unincorporated communities in West Virginia